HDMS Justitia was a Royal Dano-Norwegian Navy ship-of-the-line, built to a design by Henrik Gerner. Although launched in 1777, she was not fully commissioned until 1780. The British Royal Navy seized her in 1807, together with the rest of the Danish fleet after the second battle of Copenhagen. The British never commissioned Justitia. A renaming to Orford in 1809 was cancelled. She was broken up in 1817.

HDMS Justitia (1777)

HDMS Justitia served in the home fleet based in Copenhagen for the whole of its active life in the Danish navy, when new acting as flagship to the admiral commanding the home squadron. Her captains and admirals include
Admiral on the flagship Justitia - Vice Admiral Carl Friderich de Fontenay (1781 and 1782).
Flag captains on Justitia - Hans Georg Krog (1780),  Johan Peter Wleugel (1782),
Captains when Justitia was not the flagship -Hans Schiønnebøl (1781), Anton Friderich Lützow (1789), and Svend Martin Ursin (1800).
In 1786 Lorentz Henrik Fisker was second in command of Justitia in the home squadron 
In 1788 Commodore Just Bille put forward proposals for the testing of the new 36 pound cannon in HDMS Justitia. These trials took place in June and July 1788  with Poul de Løvenørn as the official observer
In 1788 Peder Janus Bording was Captain of HDMS Justitia in the home squadron which served alongside the Russian squadron involved with the Russo-Swedish War (1788–1790) commanded by the Russian vice admiral von Dessen. In August of that year Justitia accompanied ship-of-the-line Lovisa Augusta and the frigate Møen on a secret mission to the North Sea (for which details are lacking!), and later on artillery trials.

Justitia does not appear to have been involved in the 1801 battle of Copenhagen but was present at the 1807 battle when the majority of the Danish fleet was surrendered to the British. At that point the Royal Danish Navy struck her from the lists.

HMS Justitia
Justitia  was one of the many ships the British Royal Navy seized after the battle. She arrived at Portsmouth on 5 December 1807 and then was laid up.

Fate
The "Principal Officers and Commissioners of His Majesty's Navy" offered Justitia, of 74 guns and 1758 tons, was first advertised for sale and breaking up in July 1814. The successful purchaser had to give a bond to complete the breaking up within one year. However she did not sell.

In February 1817 the Navy used her for experiments with Robert Seppings diagonal braces. She was then broken up at Portsmouth in March 1817.

Notes

Citations

References

 Balsved - Danish Naval History website
 Threedecks website - Justitia (1777)
 T. A. Topsøe-Jensen og Emil Marquard (1935) "Officerer i den dansk-norske Søetat 1660-1814 og den danske Søetat 1814-1932“. Two volumes. Volume 1 and Volume 2 Hard copies are listed in libraries Stockholm, Odense, Ballerup and Copenhagen
 

1777 ships
Ships of the line of the Royal Danish Navy
Captured ships
Ships of the line of the Royal Navy
Ships designed by Henrik Gerner
Ships built in Copenhagen